Guymi is a rural locality (a selo) in Karashinsky Selsoviet, Laksky District, Republic of Dagestan, Russia. The population was 69 as of 2010. There is one street.

Geography 
Guymi is located 36 km northeast of Kumukh (the district's administrative centre) by road, on the Karashinskaya River. Karasha and Uchutakl are the nearest rural localities.

Nationalities 
Laks live there.

References 

Rural localities in Laksky District